Green Island is a little uninhabited islet about 250 metres north of the Caribbean island of Saba, and is part of the Dutch special municipality of Saba. It measures about 40 by 60 metres.

The island is being used by bridled terns, sooty terns, and brown noddies for breeding. There was a sulphur mine on the main island across from Green Island. In the 1870s, the two islands were connected by a cable in order to provide access to the mines. The island is being used as a diving site.

References

Islands of the Netherlands Antilles
Landforms of Saba
Uninhabited islands of the Netherlands